Rael, also spelled Ra'il, is a Turkmen village in northern Aleppo Governorate, northwestern Syria. Nearby localities include Ihtaimlat  to the south and Dabiq  to the south. In the 2004 census, Rael had a population of 1,750. Traveler Martin Hartmann noted the village as a Turkish village in late 19th century.

References

Populated places in Azaz District
Turkmen communities in Syria